+39 Challenge was a yacht racing team established in 2004 that competed for the Louis Vuitton Cup 2007, the challenger series held prior to the America's Cup. The teams was based at the Yacht club "Circolo Vela Gargnano" in Gargnano, Italy, and was owned by Lorenzo Rizzardi, the president of the club. Originally named the "Clan Des Team", +39 was the first team to join BMW Oracle Racing on the challenger list for the 2007 America's Cup.

Prior experience
Prior to competing for the Louis Vuitton Cup in 2007, some of the team had previous experience in international yachting as competitors in the Finn class at the 2000 and 2004 Summer Olympics. The skipper, Luca Devoti, and Helmsman Iain Percy (who represented Great Britain), respectively earned the Silver and Gold medals in the Finn class at the 2000 Olympics in Sydney, Australia. Five members of the team also competed  at the 2004 Summer Olympics in Athens, Greece, including Spanish silver medallist Rafael Trujillo.

2007 Louis Vuitton Cup
The +39 Challenge was one of three Italian teams which competed for the 2007 Louis Vuitton Cup in Valencia, Spain.  The team placed 9th in the round robins, and did not qualify for the semi-finals. They broke their mast during Act 13, due to an incident caused by United Internet Team Germany, but managed to replace it before the start of Round Robin 2.  +39 Challenge were awarded redress against the German team who were found to have broken rules regulating opposite tacks and avoiding contact.  +39 Challenge were awarded fifth place in the Act and full costs for the repair of their boat.

Personnel

Managers
Team owner : Lorenzo Rizzardi
Team leader: Cesare Pasotti
Skipper and technical advisor: Luca Devoti
Designer: Giovanni Ceccarelli

Crew 
Helmsman: Iain Percy  *Tactician: Ian Walker
Navigator: Bruno Zirilli
Afterguard: Andrew Simpson
Traveller: Gabriele Bruni
Runners: Anthony Nossiter
Mainsail Trimmer: Rafael Trujillo
Main Grinder: Michele Gnutti
Trimmer: Stefano Rizzi
Trimmer: Christian Scherrer
Grinder: Chris Brittle
Grinder: Pawel Bielecki
Mast: Alejandro Colla
Mast / Pit: Massimo Galli
Sewer: Piero Romeo
Mid-Bow: Corrado Rossignoli
Bow: Jacek Wisoski

See also
 Italy at the America's Cup

References

America's Cup teams
2004 establishments in Italy